Dobreni is a commune in Neamț County, Western Moldavia, Romania. It is composed of three villages: Cășăria, Dobreni and Sărata.

Natives
 Constantin Daniel Stahi

References

Communes in Neamț County
Localities in Western Moldavia